A dual ball joint suspension uses a pair of arms, one in tension, one in compression, to replace a wishbone, in a MacPherson or SLA suspension. The outer end of each arm terminates in a ball joint, hence the name.

General description 
The two arms, the spindle, and the body, form a four-bar link. Use of the linkage at the lower suspension connection of either a MacPherson strut or a short long arms suspension readily gives an effective virtual ball joint outboard of the spindle, which is very useful for a suspension designer, allowing negative scrub radius whilst allowing the ball joints to move in and thus out of the way of the brakes. Some manufacturers use a double ball joint arm to replace both wishbones on a short long arms suspension. This provides further opportunity for optimising the geometry.

Examples
It is used on large cars such as the Lexus LS 460, BMW X5, Ford Territory, and General Motors' Zeta-derived models.

Disadvantages
The extra ball joint adds weight and cost. It also increases steering friction, and the parasitic friction in the suspension. The geometry has some undesirable characteristics that need careful management, such as returnability from full lock when parking.

References

 The Automotive Chassis Engineering Principles, J. Reimpell, H. Stoll, J. W. Betzler, 

Automotive suspension technologies